The Chile national under-17 football team is the representative of Chile within FIFA and participates in international football competitions such as FIFA U-17 World Cup and South American Under-17 Football Championship. It is part of the Federación de Fútbol de Chile and it participated in the 1993, 1997, 2015 and 2017 editions of the FIFA U-17 World Cup tournament. As the host nation, Chile qualified automatically for the 2015 edition.

Chile Under-17 World Cup appearances

Japan 1993
The 1993 FIFA U-17 World Championship was held in Japan from 21 August to 4 September in the Japanese cities of Tokyo, Hiroshima, Kyoto, Kobe, Nagoya and Gifu.

This was to be Chile's first presentation on the U-17 international tournament stage. Attainment occurred by finishing in second place at the 1993 South American Under-17 Football Championship, behind Colombia and ahead of Argentina.

Of the four groups in the tournament, Chile were located in Group D which contained Poland, Tunisia and China. The group games were held in the city of Hiroshima and on 22 August, Chile faced China, the winners of the AFC U-16 Championship. The game ended in a 2–2 draw. On 24 August, Chile played against Tunisia, where Chile came away victorious by a score of 2–0. The third match was to be a highly contested match-up against Poland, and a battle for first place within Group D would ensue. The match ended 3–3 with Chile qualifying in second place with a total of 4 points.

In the quarterfinals, Chile's opponent was the former country of Czechoslovakia on 29 August in Kyoto. Chile went on to defeat Czechoslovakia 4–1 gaining a spot in the semifinals.

On 1 September, the semifinals featured Chile vs. Ghana. The speed, counterattacking and strength of the African players defeated the Chilean squad. The match ended 3–0 and relegated Chile towards the consolation prize of the tournament, which was third place.

The third-place position reunited Chile with Poland, where after another battle, Chile would go on to tie Poland with a penalty kick from Sebastian Rozental during the closing minutes of the match, after Chile were down most of the game with an own goal against them. Chile ultimately won the penalty kick shootout (4)-(2) and gained a third-place finish.

Egypt 1997
For the 1997 edition, Chile qualified by finishing in third place behind both Brazil and Argentina in the 1997 South American Under-17 Football Championship.

The tournament was held in Egypt in the cities of Cairo, Ismailia, Alexandria and Port Said from 4 September to 21 September. Chile was located in Group A which included hosts Egypt, Germany and Thailand. On 5 September, Chile played Germany in the capital of Cairo and after a scoreless first half, Chile was defeated by the Germans 1–0.

On 7 September, Chile played the host country of Egypt in the same venue. After Egypt was winning by a goal, Chile went on to tie and the game finished 1–1. On 10 September in Ismalia, Chile's final group match featured them against Thailand. Chile defeated the Southeast Asian country by a score of 6–2, but the result would not be good enough for them to advance onto the second round as Chile with only 4 points could not surpass Egypt who came in second place with 5 points.

Chile 2015
In 2011, Chile was chosen to host the 2015 FIFA U-17 World Cup, therefore the team qualified automatically for the tournament.

India 2017
For the 2017 edition, Chile qualified by finishing in second place behind Brazil and ahead of Paraguay in the 2017 South American Under-17 Football Championship.

Competitive record

FIFA Under-17 World Cup record

South American Under-17 Football Championship record

*Draws include knockout matches decided on penalty kicks.

Honours

 FIFA U-17 World Cup
 Third place (1): 1993
 South American Under-17 Football Championship
 Runners-ups (2): 1993, 2017
 Third place (1): 1997

By match

Record by opponent

Former squads

1993 FIFA U-17 World Championship

Coach: Leonardo Véliz

1997 FIFA U-17 World Championship

Coach: Vladimir Bigorra

2015 FIFA U-17 World Cup
Coach: Miguel Ponce

2017 FIFA U-17 World Cup
Coach: Hernán Caputto

2019 FIFA U-17 World Cup
Coach: Cristian Leiva

Current squad

Head coach: Cristian Leiva

See also
Chile national football team
Chile national under-20 football team

References

External links
 FIFA.com: FIFA U-17 World Championship Egypt 1997
Chilean football forum on national teams

Under
South American national under-17 association football teams
Youth sport in Chile